Hindoo is an archaic spelling of Hindu and one whose use today may be considered derogatory.

Hindoo may also refer to:

 Hindoo (horse), a racehorse
 Hindoo style, a Western style of architecture in which Indian motifs are used
 Hindoo, a Norwegian bark wrecked and beached on Dog Island, Florida

See also
 Hindoo Stuart (1758–1828), officer in the East India Company Army
 Hindu (disambiguation)